Gjon Zef Ndoja (born 18 May 1991 in Shkoder) is an Albanian professional basketball player who currently plays for BC Vllaznia in the Albanian Basketball League.

References

External links
Profile at Real GM.com

1991 births
Living people
Albanian men's basketball players
Basketball players from Shkodër
Power forwards (basketball)